Carlos López y Valles (November 4, 1887 – February 13, 1942), better known as Chaflán, was a Mexican comedian, singer, and film actor of the Golden Age of Mexican cinema. He should not be mistaken for Carlos López Moctezuma, another Mexican actor.

Selected filmography
 The Treasure of Pancho Villa (1935)
 Women of Today (1936)
 Let's Go with Pancho Villa (1936)
 While Mexico Sleeps (1938)
 Guadalajara (1943)

References

Bibliography
 Herzberg, Bob. Revolutionary Mexico on Film: A Critical History, 1914–2014. McFarland, 2014.

External links

1887 births
1942 deaths
Mexican male film actors
Male actors from Durango
20th-century Mexican male actors